Ilse von Glatz (August 21, 1958 – May 2, 2014) was a Canadian actress who played an Advocate in the 1988 science fiction TV series War of the Worlds. She also appeared as an employment counsellor in "The Mind of Simon Foster", an episode of the 1985 version of The Twilight Zone).  She also appeared in at least one episode of Friday the 13th: The Series in 1989.

Filmography

References

External links

1958 births
2014 deaths
20th-century Canadian actresses
Actresses from Windsor, Ontario
Canadian film actresses
Canadian television actresses